Lowell is a city in Lane County, in the U.S. state of Oregon. As of the 2010 census, the city population was 1,045. The city is on the north shore of Dexter Reservoir on the Middle Fork Willamette River. The most used route to Lowell is along Lowell Bridge, a covered bridge that crosses the reservoir from Oregon Route 58.

History
A post office called Lowell has been in operation since 1883. The city was named after Lowell, Maine.

Geography
The town of Lowell is surrounded by three reservoirs, respectively Dexter, Lookout Point, and Fall Creek. This makes the town a popular recreation area for people from Eugene and Springfield.

Climate
The climate of Lowell differs slightly from that of Eugene, which is at lower elevation. Lowell receives  more of rain and  more of snow per year than Eugene. In central Lane County, that two inches is significant considering the lack of snow. The higher areas of the town receive more snow and rain as well. Wedged among three reservoirs, it experiences thick winter fog.

Demographics

2010 census
As of the census of 2010, there were 1,045 people, 397 households, and 298 families living in the city. The racial makeup of the city was 90.9% White, 1.7% Native American, 0.7% Asian, 0.7% from other races, and 6.0% from two or more races. Hispanic or Latino of any race were 3.5% of the population.

There were 397 households, of which 35.8% had children under the age of 18 living with them, 58.9% were married couples living together, 10.1% had a female householder with no husband present, 6.0% had a male householder with no wife present, and 24.9% were non-families. 19.1% of all households were made up of individuals, and 3.3% had someone living alone who was 65 years of age or older. The average household size was 2.63 and the average family size was 2.97.

The median age in the city was 39 years. 27.5% of residents were under the age of 18; 4% were between the ages of 18 and 24; 26.8% were from 25 to 44; 32.7% were from 45 to 64; and 9.1% were 65 years of age or older. The gender makeup of the city was 50.8% male and 49.2% female.

2000 census
As of the census of 2000, there were 857 people, 315 households, and 236 families living in the city. The population density was 930.3 people per square mile (359.7/km). There were 342 housing units at an average density of 371.2 per square mile (143.5/km). The racial makeup of the city was 91.83% White, 1.98% Native American, 0.23% Asian, 0.23% Pacific Islander, 1.28% from other races, and 4.43% from two or more races. Hispanic or Latino of any race were 4.55% of the population. There were 315 households, out of which 37.5% had children under the age of 18 living with them, 58.4% were married couples living together, 13.0% had a female householder with no husband present, and 24.8% were non-families. 18.7% of all households were made up of individuals, and 6.7% had someone living alone who was 65 years of age or older. The average household size was 2.72 and the average family size was 3.10.

In the city, the population was 27.9% under the age of 18, 10.5% from 18 to 24, 29.6% from 25 to 44, 23.8% from 45 to 64, and 8.2% who were 65 years of age or older. The median age was 34 years. For every 100 females, there were 96.6 males. For every 100 females age 18 and over, there were 98.1 males. The median income for a household in the city was $35,536, and the median income for a family was $41,563. Males had a median income of $31,484 versus $18,125 for females. The per capita income for the city was $14,078. 11.5% of the population and 8.3% of families were below the poverty line. 18.6% of those under the age of 18 and 2.8% of those 65 and older were living below the poverty line.

Notable People 
Mitchell Riberal - Mitchell graduated from Lowell High School and is currently a Sports Anchor/Reporter in St. Joseph, Mo. Covering the Kansas City Chiefs

See also
Jones Fire

References

External links

Entry for Lowell in the Oregon Blue Book

Cities in Oregon
Cities in Lane County, Oregon
1954 establishments in Oregon
Populated places on the Willamette River